The 1992 Purdue Boilermakers football team represented Purdue University as a member of the Big Ten Conference during the 1992 NCAA Division I-A football season. Led by second-year head coach Jim Colletto, the Boilermakers compiled an overall record of 4–7 with a mark of 3–5 in conference play, tying for sixth place the Big Ten. Purdue suffered its eighth consecutive losing season. The team played home games at Ross–Ade Stadium in West Lafayette, Indiana.

Schedule

Roster

Game summaries

Northwestern
 Arlee Connors 15 rushes, 112 yards

Minnesota
 Arlee Connors 25 rushes, 138 yards

Indiana
 Eric Hunter 16 rushes, 117 yards

References

Purdue
Purdue Boilermakers football seasons
Purdue Boilermakers football